Peter Kilabuk (born 27 September 1960 in Pangnirtung, Northwest Territories (now Nunavut)) is a Canadian politician, who was the Member of the Legislative Assembly (MLA) for the electoral district of Pangnirtung in the Legislative Assembly of Nunavut from 1999 to 2008.

On 9 June 2006 Kilabuk was appointed speaker of the Legislative Assembly. He did not stand for re-election in the 2008 territorial election.

Prior to becoming an MLA, Kilabuk worked for Parks Canada and is a member of the Canadian Rangers.

External links
Peter Kilabuk at the Legislative Assembly of Nunavut
CBC report on Kilaubk's appointment as speaker

1960 births
Living people
Inuit from the Northwest Territories
Inuit politicians
Members of the Legislative Assembly of Nunavut
21st-century Canadian politicians
People from Pangnirtung
Speakers of the Legislative Assembly of Nunavut
Inuit from Nunavut